Wilhelm Baumann (22 December 1925 - 16 February 2015) was a German politician from the Christian Social Union of Bavaria. He was a member of the Landtag of Bavaria from 1978 to 1990.

References

1925 births
2015 deaths
People from Schweinfurt
Members of the Landtag of Bavaria
Christian Social Union in Bavaria politicians